Antananarivo-Avaradrano is a district of Analamanga in Madagascar.

It covers the smaller communes in the outskirts of Antananarivo, the capital of Madagascar.

Communes
 Alasora
 Ambohidrabiby
 Ambohimalaza Miray
 Ambohimanambola
 Ambohimanga Rova
 Ambohimangakely
 Anjeva Gara
 Ankadikely Ilafy
 Ankadinandriana
 Anosy Avaratra
 Fieferana
 Manandriana
 Masindray
 Sabotsy Namehana
 Talata Volonondry
 Viliahazo

References 

Districts of Analamanga